Luciano Salce (25 September 1922 – 17 December 1989) was an Italian film director, comedian, tv host, producer, actor and lyricist. His 1962 film Le pillole di Ercole was shown as part of a retrospective on Italian comedy at the 67th Venice International Film Festival.

As a writer of pop music, he used the pseudonym Pilantra. During World War II, he was a prisoner in Germany. He later worked for several years in Brazil.

Selected filmography

Director

 A Flea on the Scales (1953)
 The Fascist (1961)
 Le pillole di Ercole (1962)
 La voglia matta (1962)
 La cuccagna (1962)
 Le ore dell'amore (1963)
 Alta infedeltà (1964)
 El Greco (1964)
 Slalom (1965)
 The Man, the Woman and the Money (1965)
 Le fate (1966)
 Come imparai ad amare le donne (1967)
 Ti ho sposato per allegria (1967)
 La pecora nera (1968)
 Colpo di stato (1969)
 Il Prof. Dott. Guido Tersilli, primario della clinica Villa Celeste, convenzionata con le mutue (1969)
 Basta guardarla (1970)
 Il provinciale (1971)
 Il sindacalista (1972)
 Io e lui (1973)
 Alla mia cara mamma nel giorno del suo compleanno (1974)
 L'anatra all'arancia (1975)
 Fantozzi (1975)
 L'affittacamere (1976)
 Il secondo tragico Fantozzi (1976)
 La presidentessa (1977)
 Il... Belpaese (1977)
 Dove vai in vacanza? (1978)
 Professor Kranz tedesco di Germania (1978)
 Riavanti... marsch! (1979)
 Rag. Arturo De Fanti, bancario precario (1980)
 Vieni avanti cretino (1982)
 Vediamoci chiaro (1984)
 Quelli del casco (1988)

Actor

 A Yank in Rome (1946) - L'ufficiale americano
 Caiçara (1950) - (voice)
 Terra É Sempre Terra (1951)
 Ângela (1951)
 Floradas na Serra (1954)
 Angela (1954) - (uncredited)
 Piccola posta (1955) - Dog Wotan's Owner
 Toto in the Moon (1958) - Von Braun
 Maid, Thief and Guard (1958) - Il Conte tedesco
 Tipi da spiaggia (1959) - Ionescu - the psychoanalyst
 I baccanali di Tiberio (1960) - Coronel
 Il carabiniere a cavallo (1961) - Il prete
 The Fascist (1961) - German officer (uncredited)
 La ragazza di mille mesi (1961) - La Psicanalista
 La voglia matta (1962) - Bisigato (uncredited)
 La cuccagna (1962) - Il colonnello (uncredited)
 Le ore dell'amore (1963) - (uncredited)
 Gli onorevoli (1963) - Un invitato (uncredited)
 The Man, the Woman and the Money (1965) - Arturo Rossi (segment "L'ora di punta")
 Anyone Can Play (1968) - Psychiatrist Dr. Stelluti
 Colpo di stato (1969) - Himself
 Oh dolci baci e languide carezze (1970) - Carlo Valcini
 The Swinging Confessors (1970) - Monsignor Torelli
 Basta guardarla (1970) - Farfarello
 Mazzabubù... quante corna stanno quaggiù? (1971) - Il critico d'arte
 Homo Eroticus (1971) - Achille Lampugnani
 Non commettere atti impuri (1971) - Damiano
 Hector the Mighty (1972) - Mercurio
 Anche se volessi lavorare, che faccio? (1972) - Maresciallo Dorigo
 Hospitals: The White Mafia (1973) - Enrico
 La signora è stata violentata (1973) - Il monsignore
 Three Tough Guys (1974) - The bishop
 Commissariato di notturna (1974) - On. Luigi Colacioppi
 Il domestico (1974) - The director
 Amore mio non farmi male (1974) - Carlo Foschini
 City Under Siege (1974) - Paolo Ferrero
 Nipoti miei diletti (1974) - Don Vittorio
 Son tornate a fiorire le rose (1975) - Carlo Foschini
 Di che segno sei? (1975) - Leonardo
 I prosseneti (1976) - Giorgio
 Perdutamente tuo... mi firmo Macaluso Carmelo fu Giuseppe (1976) - Barone Alfonso Lamìa
 Maschio latino cercasi (1977) - colonnello (segment "L'amnistia")
 Ride bene... chi ride ultimo (1977) - Maresciallo (segment "Sedotto e violentato") / Bepi Pastorino (segment "La visita di controllo")
 La presidentessa (1977) - Bortignon
 Voglia di donna (1978) - Il matto
 Tanto va la gatta al lardo... (1978) - Dino Chini / Amilcare Severi
 Ridendo e scherzando (1978) - Lucio Sartori
 Belli e brutti ridono tutti (1979) - Santucci
 Riavanti... marsch! (1979) - Prof. Eduardo Settebeni
 Rag. Arturo De Fanti, bancario precario (1980) - Paolo Lavetti
 Vieni avanti cretino (1982) - Himself (uncredited)

Bibliography

Andrea Pergolari, Verso la commedia. Momenti del cinema di Steno, Salce, Festa Campanile, Firenze Libri, Rome, 2002.
Andrea Pergolari, Emanuele Salce, Luciano Salce: Una vita spettacolare, Edilazio, Rome, 2009.

References

External links

1922 births
1989 deaths
Film directors from Rome
Italian lyricists
Accademia Nazionale di Arte Drammatica Silvio D'Amico alumni
People of Venetian descent
People of Marchesan descent
Italian military personnel of World War II